Odontophrynus cordobae (in Spanish: escuercito) is a species of frog in the family Odontophrynidae. It is endemic to northern Argentina and known from Córdoba and Santiago del Estero Provinces. This diploid species was separated from the tetraploid Odontophrynus americanus in 2002. It inhabits montane grasslands and forests and can be found under rocks. Reproduction takes place in permanent mountain streams. The tadpoles require more than a year to reach metamorphosis. It is common in suitable habitats. It tolerates substantial habitat modification but habitat destruction for wood extraction and cattle ranching can threaten it.

References

cordobae
Endemic fauna of Argentina
Amphibians of Argentina
Frogs of South America
Amphibians described in 2002
Taxonomy articles created by Polbot